In commutative algebra and algebraic geometry, a morphism is called formally étale if it has a lifting property that is analogous to being a local diffeomorphism.

Formally étale homomorphisms of rings 
Let A be a topological ring, and let B be a topological A-algebra. Then B is formally étale if for all discrete A-algebras C, all nilpotent ideals J of C, and all continuous A-homomorphisms , there exists a unique continuous A-algebra map  such that , where  is the canonical projection.

Formally étale is equivalent to formally smooth plus formally unramified.

Formally étale morphisms of schemes 
Since the structure sheaf of a scheme naturally carries only the discrete topology, the notion of formally étale for schemes is analogous to formally étale for the discrete topology for rings.  That is, a morphism of schemes   is formally étale if for every affine Y-scheme Z, every nilpotent sheaf of ideals J on Z with  be the closed immersion determined by J, and every Y-morphism , there exists a unique Y-morphism  such that .

It is equivalent to let Z be any Y-scheme and let J be a locally nilpotent sheaf of ideals on Z.

Properties 
Open immersions are formally étale.
The property of being formally étale is preserved under composites, base change, and fibered products.
In particular, if g is formally étale, then f is formally étale if and only if gf is.
 The property of being formally étale is local on the source and target.
 The property of being formally étale can be checked on stalks.  One can show that a morphism of rings  is formally étale if and only if for every prime Q of B, the induced map  is formally étale.  Consequently, f is formally étale if and only if for every prime Q of B, the map  is formally étale, where .

Examples 
Localizations are formally étale.
Finite separable field extensions are formally étale. More generally, any (commutative) flat separable A-algebra B is formally étale.

See also 
 Formally unramified
 Formally smooth
 Étale morphism

Notes

References 
 

Morphisms of schemes